Valonetus is a genus of dirt-colored seed bugs in the family Rhyparochromidae. There is one described species in Valonetus, V. puberulus.

References

Rhyparochromidae
Articles created by Qbugbot
Pentatomomorpha genera